The 2004 Italian Formula Three Championship was the 40th Italian Formula Three Championship season. It began on 4 April at Adria and ended on 24 October at Misano after fourteen races.

Matteo Cressoni of Ombra Racing won the opening race at Adria, race at Pergusa and had another six podiums and ultimately clinched the title. Coloni Motorsport's Toni Vilander had six wins and the same number of points as Cressoni, but he was ineligible to contest for the title. Third place went to Lucidi Motors driver Alex Frassineti, who took one victory, and he finished ahead of Imola winner Michele Rugolo, who competed with Team Ghinzani.

Teams and drivers
All teams were Italian-registered and all cars competed on Hankook tyres.

Calendar
All rounds were held in Italy.

Standings
Points are awarded as follows:

Notes

References

External links
 Official website

Italian Formula Three Championship seasons
Formula Three
Italian
Italian Formula 3 Championship